Sonali Chakravarti Banerjee is an Indian academician who is the past vice-chancellor of the University of Calcutta.

Career
Banerjee completed her Bachelor's studies from Presidency College, Kolkata (as a graduating student of the University of Calcutta), and subsequently, earned her postgraduate and doctoral degrees from the University of Calcutta.
In August 2017 she was appointed as the vice-chancellor of the University of Calcutta, after the then vice-chancellor Suranjan Das was transferred to Jadavpur University. She is the first lady Vice Chancellor of the University of Calcutta.

Personal life
She is a daughter of Bengali poet Nirendranath Chakravarty and freedom fighter Sushama Chakravarti. She is married to Alapan Bandyopadhyay, who was the former Chief Secretary to the Government of West Bengal and now serving as the Chief Advisor to the Chief Minister of West Bengal.

References 

Vice Chancellors of the University of Calcutta
Living people
University of Calcutta alumni
Academic staff of the University of Calcutta
Presidency University, Kolkata alumni
West Bengal academics
Year of birth missing (living people)
Scholars from West Bengal